Pandemis ianus is a moth of the family Tortricidae. It is found in north Madagascar.

The male of this species has a wingspan of 21.5 mm. Its head is tawny fuscous, palus tawny, the thorax tawny ochreous, abdomen greyish fuscous.

The forewings are suboval with a rounded costa. They are light pinkish ochreous, glossy and strewn with fuscous grey.
The hindwings are golden ochreous, the posterior third with a pink suffusion and irregularly transversed by rows of dark grey dots.

The genitalia of this species are close to Pandemis capnobathra.

References

Moths described in 1970
Pandemis
Moths of Madagascar
Moths of Africa